Nepenthes tboli is a tropical pitcher plant native to the Philippines.

Conservation
Nepenthes tboli is considered rare and is only known from a few specimens where it was initially collected. The species is in danger of extinction due to habitat loss as a result of human expansion.

References

 Cheek, M. & M. Jebb 2013. Recircumscription of the Nepenthes alata group (Caryophyllales: Nepenthaceae), in the Philippines, with four new species. European Journal of Taxonomy 69: 1–23. 

Carnivorous plants of Asia
tboli
Endemic flora of the Philippines
Flora of Mindanao
Plants described in 2014
Taxa named by Martin Cheek
Taxa named by Matthew Jebb